Justine is a 1969 American drama film directed by George Cukor and Joseph Strick. It was written by Lawrence B. Marcus (with uncredited contributions from critic Andrew Sarris), based on the 1957 novel Justine by Lawrence Durrell, which was part of the series The Alexandria Quartet.

Plot
Set in Alexandria in 1938, a young British schoolmaster named Darley meets Pursewarden, a British consular officer. Pursewarden introduces him to Justine, the wife of an Egyptian banker. Darley befriends her, and discovers she is involved in a plot against the British, the goal of which is to arm the Jewish underground movement in Palestine.

Cast
 Anouk Aimée as Justine
 Dirk Bogarde as Pursewarden
 Michael York as Darley
 Robert Forster as Narouz
 Anna Karina as Melissa
 Philippe Noiret as Pombal
 John Vernon as Nessim
 Jack Albertson as Cohen
 Cliff Gorman as "Toto"
 George Baker as Mountolive
 Elaine Church as Liza
 Michael Constantine as Memlik Pasha
 Marcel Dalio as French Consul General
 Michael Dunn as Mnemjian
 Barry Morse as Maskelyne
 Danielle Roter as Drusilla

Production
The film's pre-production was prepared by director Joseph Strick, who intended to shoot the movie in Morocco. He did some location filming there, but fought with the executives at Fox and with star Anouk Aimée. When he did not hire others for the film as instructed by the studio and slept on the set while working on one of Aimee's scenes, they fired him and George Cukor was brought in. He proceeded to bring the film to Hollywood where the remainder of the film was finished. It became a financial flop and received critical reviews.

Some scenes were shot at Ennejma Ezzahra, a palace at Sidi Bou Said, in northern Tunisia.

Reception
According to Fox records the film required $12,775,000 in rentals to break even and by 11 December 1970 had made $2,775,000. In September 1970 the studio reported it had lost $6,602,000 on the film.

See also
 List of American films of 1969

References

External links 
 
 

1969 films
1969 drama films
1969 LGBT-related films
American drama films
Films based on British novels
Films scored by Jerry Goldsmith
Films directed by George Cukor
Films directed by Joseph Strick
Films set in 1938
Films set in Alexandria
1960s English-language films
1960s American films